The men's team sprint competition at the 2010 Asian Games was held on 13 and 14 November at the Guangzhou Velodrome.

Schedule
All times are China Standard Time (UTC+08:00)

Results

Qualifying

Finals

Bronze

Gold

References

External links 
Results

Track Men Team sprint